Omer Halilhodžić (born 1963 in Mostar, Bosnia and Herzegovina) is a Bosnian automotive designer. 
 
Halilhodžić was previously a member of the famous designer team of Ferrari.

A graduate of the University of Sarajevo with a degree in industrial design, Halilhodžić is currently a member of the designer team of Volkswagen. Before rejoining Volkswagen in 2021 he was working as an exterior designer and a creative design consultant for exterior design team of Škoda for almost ten years.  
Before that he was the exterior chief designer for the European styling centre of Mercedes-Benz, based in Germany. He moved to Mercedes-Benz in January 2008 after working for Mitsubishi Motors since 1995; he was previously employed at Volkswagen since 1991 and started his career in Herzegovina Auto in 1989.  

He considers Leonardo da Vinci to be the greatest designer of all time, and looks to nature for his inspirations.

He was responsible for the styling of the 2004 Mitsubishi Colt, and the concept cars which preceded it: CZ2, CZ3, CZ3 cabriolet, and CZT. He has since penned the Mitsubishi Concept Sportback, and the Mitsubishi Concept X, which presages the Mitsubishi Lancer Evolution X production car.

References

1963 births
Living people
Bosniaks of Bosnia and Herzegovina
Automobile designers
University of Sarajevo alumni
Volkswagen Group designers